Askold Ivanovich Vinogradov  (1929 – 31 December 2005) was a Russian mathematician working in analytic number theory. The Bombieri–Vinogradov theorem is partially named after him.

References

External links
Publications of A.I. Vinogradov

Russian mathematicians
1929 births
2005 deaths